George J. Woerth was a member of the Wisconsin State Assembly

Biography
Woerth was born on December 4, 1875, in Loganville, Wisconsin. He attended Wartburg College.

Career
Woerth was first a member of the Assembly from 1935 to 1939 as a member of the Wisconsin Progressive Party. He was defeated in 1938 by Charles Enge. Woerth later re-joined the Assembly in 1940 and became a member of the Republican Party.

References

People from Sauk County, Wisconsin
Republican Party members of the Wisconsin State Assembly
Wisconsin Progressives (1924)
20th-century American politicians
Wartburg College alumni
1875 births
Year of death missing